Lightning Strikes may refer to:

Lightning strike, an electric discharge between the atmosphere and the ground

Albums
[[Lightnin' Strikes (Vee-Jay album)|Lightnin''' Strikes (Vee-Jay album)]], 1962
Lightnin' Strikes (Verve Folkways album), 1966
Lightning Strikes (Loudness album), 1986 
Lightning Strikes (Aceyalone album), 2007

Songs
"Lightnin' Strikes", a 1965 Lou Christie single 
"Lightning Strikes" (Aerosmith song), 1982
"Lightning Strikes", a song by The Smashing Pumpkins from Teargarden by Kaleidyscope"The Lightning Strike", a 2008 song by Snow Patrol
"Lightning Strikes", a song by Yes from The Ladder''

Other uses
Lightning Strikes (band), an American heavy metal band
"Lightning Strikes" (Beavis and Butt-head Episode), 1995
Lightning Strikes (film), a 2009 horror film produced by Phillip J. Roth